Cnemaspis umashaankeri is a species of diurnal, rock-dwelling, insectivorous gecko endemic to  India.

References

 Cnemaspis umashaankeri

umashaankeri
Reptiles of India
Reptiles described in 2021